"All Night Long" is a song written, arranged and produced by American musician Rick James for the Mary Jane Girls.

In the U.S. the song enjoyed success on the Hot Black Singles Chart peaking at No. 11; on the Dance Chart it peaked at No. 8, but the song failed to succeed in the general public peaking only at No. 101 on the Billboard Bubbling Under the Hot 100 chart. It is their only hit song on the UK charts peaking at No. 13.

The bassline interpolates Keni Burke's 1982 single "Risin' to the Top". The song has been heavily sampled since its inception, including by artists Groove Theory, LL Cool J and Mary J. Blige.

The song was included in the soundtrack of the 2002 video game Grand Theft Auto: Vice City, as well as the soundtrack of the 2001 Tom Green film Freddy Got Fingered.

Billboard named the song No. 61 on their list of 100 Greatest Girl Group Songs of All Time.

Charts

Sampling
The Black Eyed Peas sampled "All Night Long" in their song "Audio Delite at Low Fidelity" from their album Monkey Business.
American entertainer Jennifer Lopez sampled "All Night Long" in the Murder Remix for her song "I'm Real."
LL Cool J sampled "All Night Long" (along with the song from which "All Night Long"'s bassline was taken, Keni Burke's "Risin' to the Top") in his song "Around the Way Girl" from the 1990 album Mama Said Knock You Out, and also in the song "Paradise" featuring Amerie from his album "10".
Mary J. Blige sampled the group's "All Night Long" for her song "Mary Jane (All Night Long)" on her 1994 album My Life.
Jay-Z sampled "All Night Long" on a song called "Only A Customer", which appeared on the 1998 soundtrack Streets is Watching.
Big Daddy Kane sampled "All Night Long" in his 1989 song "Smooth Operator".
Groove Theory sampled "All Night Long" for their song, "Tell Me."
Jeru the Damaja (via DJ Premier) sampled the drums of “All Night Long” (which were programmed on an Oberheim DMX) on the song “Da Bitchez” from the album The Sun Rises in the East.
Onar sampled "All Night Long" for the song "Klubing" on his 2003 album Wszystko co mogę mieć.
Redman sampled "All Night Long" for the songs "Tonight's da Night" and Can't Wait.
DJ Jazzy Jeff & the Fresh Prince sampled "All Night Long" on the track "I Wanna Rock" from their 1993 final studio album Code Red.
MC Zappa covered/sampled "All Night Long" on his debut album It's All A Game.

References

1983 singles
1983 songs
Songs written by Rick James
Mary Jane Girls songs
Disco songs
Song recordings produced by Rick James
Gordy Records singles